Diederich Franz Leonhard von Schlechtendal (27 November 1794, Xanten – 12 October 1866, Halle) was a German botanist. 

He studied in Berlin, in 1819 becoming curator of the Royal Herbarium. He was a professor of botany and director of the Botanical Gardens at the Martin Luther University of Halle-Wittenberg from 1833 until his death in 1866.

The genus Schlechtendalia (Asteraceae), from Brazil, Uruguay and Argentina, was named in his honor.

He was editor of the botanical journal Linnaea (from 1826), and with Hugo von Mohl (1805-1872), was publisher of the Botanischen Zeitung (from 1843).

He conducted important investigations of the then largely unknown flora of Mexico, carried out in conjunction with Adelbert von Chamisso (1781-1838), and based on specimens collected by Christian Julius Wilhelm Schiede (1798-1836) and Ferdinand Deppe (1794-1861).

Schlechtendal was a critic of Darwinism but accepted a limited form of evolution. He advocated a form common descent of "some groups of very similar species, which also inhabit a limited area".

Written works 
 Animadversiones botanicae in Ranunculaceas, Berlin 1819–1820.
 Flora berolinensis, Berlin 1823–1824.
 Adumbrationes plantarum, 1825–1832.
 Flora von Deutschland, Jena 1840–1873 (with Christian Eduard Langethal and Ernst Schenk; fifth edition by Ernst Hallier 1880–1887).
 Hortus halensis, Halle 1841–1853.

References

External links
 Biography @ Meyers Konversations-Lexikon

19th-century German botanists
German mycologists
Pteridologists
1794 births
1866 deaths
Botanists active in North America
Botanists with author abbreviations
Non-Darwinian evolution
People from Xanten
People from the Duchy of Cleves
Adelbert von Chamisso